The Balchik Palace (Dvorets v Balchik) is a palace in the Bulgarian Black Sea town and resort of Balchik in Southern Dobruja. The official name of the palace was the Quiet Nest Palace. It was constructed between 1926 and 1937, during the Romanian control of the region, for the needs of Queen Marie of Romania. The palace complex consists of a number of residential villas, a smoking hall, a wine cellar, a power station, a monastery, a holy spring, a chapel and many other buildings, as well as most notably a park that is today a state-run botanical garden.

Architectural complex
Marie of Romania, the wife of Ferdinand I of Romania, visited Balchik in 1921 and liked the location of the summer residence, ordering the vineyards, gardens and water mills of local citizens to be bought so a palace could be constructed at their place. Balkan and Ottoman Turkish motifs were used in the construction of the palace that was carried out by Italian architects Augustino and Americo, while a florist was hired from Switzerland to arrange the park. The main building's extravagant minaret coexists with a Christian chapel, perfectly illustrating the queen's Baháʼí Faith beliefs.

Today many of the former royal villas and other buildings of the complex are reorganized inside and used to accommodate tourists. Some of the older Bulgarian water mills have also been preserved and reconstructed as restaurants or tourist villas.

Botanical garden
In 1940, after the reincorporation of Southern Dobruja in Bulgaria with the Treaty of Craiova, the Balchik Botanical Garden was established at the place of the palace's park. Other notable species include the Metasequoia, the Para rubber tree and the Ginkgo.

Trivia
Francis Ford Coppola spent 11 days at the palace shooting scenes of Youth Without Youth.

Notes

External links

Palace
Dvoreca.com, official website (in Bulgarian and English)
Gallery of the Balchik Palace at Balchik.info
Info end history at Balcic.eu
Balchik Palace at Journey.bg (in Bulgarian)
Gallery of Balchik at the Jurnalul Naţional website (mostly covering the palace; in Romanian)
Nikola Gruev's gallery of the palace

BulgariaLeisure.com, Tourism Information Portal (in Bulgarian and English)

Botanical garden
University Botanical Garden - Balchik, Bulgaria (EN)
Balchik Botanical Garden at Balchik.info (in Bulgarian and English)
Book about Botanical Garden at Balcic.eu
Save the Balchik Botanical Garden! campaign (in Bulgarian)
BulgariaLeisure.com, Tourism Information Portal (in Bulgarian and English)

Botanical gardens in Bulgaria
Balchik
Dobruja
Palaces in Bulgaria
Royal residences in Bulgaria
Buildings and structures in Dobrich Province
Tourist attractions in Dobrich Province